Mark Grigorievich Krein (3 April 1907 – 17 October 1989) was a Soviet mathematician, one of the major figures of the Soviet school of functional analysis. He is known for works in operator theory (in close connection with concrete problems coming from mathematical physics), the problem of moments, classical analysis and representation theory.

He was born in Kyiv, leaving home at age 17 to go to Odessa. He had a difficult academic career, not completing his first degree and constantly being troubled by anti-Semitic discrimination. His supervisor was Nikolai Chebotaryov.

He was awarded the Wolf Prize in Mathematics in 1982 (jointly with Hassler Whitney),
but was not allowed to attend the ceremony.

David Milman, Mark Naimark, Israel Gohberg, Vadym Adamyan, Mikhail Livsic and other known mathematicians were his students.

He died in  Odessa.

On 14 January 2008, the memorial plaque of Mark Krein was unveiled on the main administration building of I.I. Mechnikov Odessa National University.

See also
 Tannaka–Krein duality
 Krein–Milman theorem and Krein–Rutman theorem in functional analysis
 Krein space
 Krein's condition for the indeterminacy of the problem of moments

External links

INTERNATIONAL CONFERENCE Modern Analysis and Applications (MAA 2007). Dedicated to the centenary of Mark Krein

1907 births
1989 deaths
Soviet mathematicians
Ukrainian Jews
Scientists from Kyiv
Wolf Prize in Mathematics laureates
Operator theorists
Functional analysts
Foreign associates of the National Academy of Sciences